Horace James "Horse" Hendrickson (August 24, 1910 – May 22, 2004) was an American football, basketball and baseball player, coach, and college athletics administrator.  He served as the head football coach at Elon University from 1937 to 1941 and at North Carolina State University from 1952 to 1953, compiling a career college football record of 35–28–1.  From 1937 to 1941, Hendrickson coached at Elon University, where he compiled a 31–12–1 record.  His best season came in 1941, when his team went 8–1. For much of the 1940s, he was an assistant coach at the University of Pennsylvania. From 1952 to 1953, he coached at North Carolina State University, where he compiled a 4–16 record.

Hendrickson played football, basketball and baseball at Duke University.  He then served as director of athletics at Elon University, and coached football, baseball and basketball from 1937 to 1942. In 1942, he moved to the University of Pennsylvania replacing Howard Odell as the backfield coach on the football team.

Family
Hendrickson was married to Gene Fulton Swartz of Derry, Pennsylvania on June 18, 1938.  The couple had two sons: Richard Fulton and James Alva.

Head coaching record

Football

References

External links
 

1910 births
2004 deaths
American football quarterbacks
American men's basketball coaches
American men's basketball players
Brooklyn Dodgers (AAFC) coaches
College men's basketball head coaches in the United States
Duke Blue Devils baseball players
Duke Blue Devils football coaches
Duke Blue Devils football players
Duke Blue Devils men's basketball players
Elon Phoenix athletic directors
Elon Phoenix baseball coaches
Elon Phoenix football coaches
Elon Phoenix men's basketball coaches
NC State Wolfpack football coaches
Penn Quakers baseball coaches
Penn Quakers football coaches
People from Delphos, Ohio
Coaches of American football from Ohio
Players of American football from Ohio
Baseball coaches from Ohio
Baseball players from Ohio
Basketball coaches from Ohio
Basketball players from Ohio